2006 Chinese FA Cup (Chinese: 2006中国足球协会杯) was the 12th edition of Chinese FA Cup. The first round matches were kicked off on 15 March 2006, and the final took place on 18 November 2006.

Results

First round
First round are single matches, with extra time and penalty shootout. The away team will progress to the next round if there were goals in the extra time and match remains in tie after extra time. Penalty shootout was used when both teams did not score in the extra time.

Second round
Second round are single matches, with extra time and penalty shootout. The away team will progress to the next round if there were goals in the extra time and match remains in tie after extra time. Penalty shootout was used when both teams did not score in the extra time.

Quarter-finals

First leg

Second leg

Semi-finals

First leg

Second leg

Final
The final is a single match, with extra time and penalty shootout if necessary.

References

2006
2006 in Chinese football
2006 domestic association football cups